A cell phone novel, or , were literary works originally written on a cellular phone via text messaging. This type of literature originated in Japan, where it became a popular literary genre. However, its popularity also spread to other countries internationally, especially to China, United States, Germany, Italy and South Africa. Chapters usually consist of about 70–100 words each due to character limitations on cell phones.

Phone novels started out primarily read and authored by young women on the subject of romantic fiction such as relationships, lovers, rape, love triangles, and pregnancy. However, mobile phone novels gained worldwide popularity on broader subjects. Rather than appearing in printed form, the literature was typically sent directly to the reader via email, SMS text message, or subscription through an online writing and sharing website, chapter by chapter. Japanese Internet ethos regarding mobile phone novels is dominated by pen names and forged identities.  Therefore, identities of the Japanese authors of mobile phone novels are rarely disclosed.

Japanese cell phone novels were also downloaded in short installments and run on handsets as Java-based mobile applications in three different formats: WMLD, JAVA and TXT. In 2007, 98 cell phone novels were published into books. Koizora was a popular phone novel with approximately 12 million views on-line, written by "Mika", that was not only published but turned into a movie.
Five out of the ten best selling novels in Japan in 2007 were originally cell phone novels.

History 

Messaging with pagers became popular with teenage girls in Japan in the 1990s, and the popularity of mobile communication devices eventually gave way to the development of literary genres based on these new media forms. The use of compact and highly contextual writing is a well-established part of Japanese literary tradition, and cell phone novels have been compared to classic Japanese literature such as the 11th-century Tale of Genji. The first cell phone novel was "published" in Japan in 2003 by a Tokyo man in his mid-thirties who calls himself Yoshi. His first cell phone novel was called Deep Love, the story of a teenager engaged in "subsidized dating" (enjō kosai) in Tokyo and contracting AIDS. It became so popular that it was published as an actual book, with 2.6 million copies sold in Japan, then spun off into a manga, a television series, and a film. The cell phone novel became a hit mainly through word of mouth and gradually started to gain traction in Taiwan, China, and South Korea among young adults.  In Japan, several sites offer large prizes to authors (up to $100,000 US) and purchase the publishing rights to the novels.

Kiki, the pseudonymous author of I, Girlfriend won the Japan Keitai Novel Award in 2008.

The movement also became popular in Europe, Africa and North America. In 2005, Random House purchased a share in Vocel, a San Diego-based company which mobile studyguides. In Europe it started in about 2007, promoted by people like Oliver Bendel and Wolfgang Hohlbein, and publishers such as Cosmoblonde or Blackbetty Mobilmedia. Teenagers in South Africa have been downloading an m-novel called Kontax – a novel specifically written for mobile phones. The pioneer cell phone novel in North America, a novel called Secondhand Memories by Takatsu – that can be viewed on Textnovel, the first English language cell phone novel site founded in the United States – has been viewed more than 60,000 times and published in print in 2015 as a paperback.

Reason for popularity 
Although Japan was the original birthplace of the cell phone novel, the phenomenon soon moved to other parts of East Asia, and many of the online writers are university students. These writers understand what narratives will attract young readers, incorporating emergent events or trendy elements from teen culture into their stories.

Cell phone novels create a virtual world for teenagers via the mobile phone, or, more precisely, via text messages. As in virtual online video games, readers can put themselves into first person in the story. Cell phone novels create a personal space for each individual reader.

The cell phone novel is changing reading habits; readers no longer need to physically go to a bookshop and purchase a book. They can go online using their cell phone, download a novel, and read it on their personal mobile phone anywhere, any time they wish. Similar to the e-book, its mobility and convenience saves time.

See also
 Drabble
 Constrained writing
 Verse novel
 Japanese mobile phone culture
 SMS
 Texting
 Light novel
 Visual novel
 Chat fiction
 Web fiction

Further reading

References

External links 
 Documentary on Cell Phone Novels Video explaining cell phone novels in North America
 Detailed Article by cell phone novelist The pioneer English cell phone novel writer, exploring cell phone novels in Japan, and in English
 The Wattpad Cell Phone Novel Network A cell phone novel writing community with resources and guides
 Mobile Phone Novel Website about cell phone novels
 India gets its first Phone Novel in Malayalam. Written & Presented by P. R. Harikumar
 Novels on your phone futureofthebook.org
 Cell phones put to novel use, wired.com
 New York Times article on cell phone novels New York Times
 Blog about textnovel.com Blog about U.S. mobile phone novel site
 Textnovel -- an English language mobile phone novel website This is the first cell phone novel website in the United States
 apple.com Article about Quillpill, which is no longer active
 echcrunch.com  article about Quillpill, a site that is no longer active
 Young women develop a genre for the cellular age Dana Goodyear writes in The New Yorker
 ip.tosp.co.jp, The Library of Magics, one of the famous websites for uploading and downloading mobile phone novels in Japan
 English Version of Japan's Biggest Mobile Social Network, Mobile Game Town This site is no longer active.

 
Mobile phone culture
Heisei period